Amalorrhynchus melanarius is a species of beetle belonging to the family Curculionidae.

Synonyms:
 Nedyus melanarius Stephens, 1831 (= basionym)
 Ceuthorhynchus convexicollis Gyllenhal, 1837
 Ceuthorhynchus camelinae Boheman, 1845
 Ceuthorhynchus glaucus Boheman, 1845
 Amalorrhynchus camelinae
 Amalorrhynchus convexicollis 
 Amalorrhynchus glaucus

References

Ceutorhynchini
Beetles described in 1831